Len Hooke (8 May 1909 – 10 July 1950) was an  Australian rules footballer who played with Fitzroy and North Melbourne in the Victorian Football League (VFL).

Notes

External links 
		

1909 births
1950 deaths
Australian rules footballers from Victoria (Australia)
Fitzroy Football Club players
North Melbourne Football Club players